Hammaptera is a genus of moths in the family Geometridae erected by Gottlieb August Wilhelm Herrich-Schäffer in 1855.

Species
Hammaptera caribbea Schaus, 1912
Hammaptera coras Druce, 1893
Hammaptera dominans Schaus, 1913
Hammaptera frondosata Guenée, [1858]
Hammaptera fulvifusa Warren, 1897
Hammaptera herbosaria Schaus, 1912
Hammaptera hypochrysa Prout, 1916
Hammaptera ignifera Thierry-Mieg, 1894
Hammaptera improbaria Schaus, 1901
Hammaptera infuscata Herbulot, 1988
Hammaptera parinotata Zeller, 1872
Hammaptera parinotata densata Grossbeck, 1909
Hammaptera parinotata tenera Warren, 1900
Hammaptera postluteata Thierry-Mieg, 1907
Hammaptera praderia Dognin, 1893
Hammaptera probataria Herrich-Schäffer, 1855
Hammaptera repandaria Schaus, 1901
Hammaptera requisitata Warren, 1900
Hammaptera rosenbergi Warren, 1900
Hammaptera sabrosa Dognin, 1893
Hammaptera semiflava Dognin, 1913
Hammaptera semiobliterata Warren, 1895
Hammaptera trochilarioides Dognin, 1901
Hammaptera undulosa Warren, 1900
Hammaptera vanonaria Schaus, 1901
Hammaptera viridifusata Walker, 1862

References

Geometridae